Viitasaari Airfield is an airfield in Viitasaari, Finland, about  north-northwest of Viitasaari town centre. , the airfield is indefinitely closed.

See also 
 List of airports in Finland

References

External links
 VFR Suomi/Finland – Viitasaari Airfield
 Lentopaikat.net – Viitasaari Airfield 

Airports in Finland